Joshua William George Smith (born 30 May 1992) is an English cricketer.  Smith is a left-handed batsman who fields as a wicket-keeper.  He was born in Oxford, Oxfordshire.

While studying for his degree at Durham University, Smith made his first-class debut for Durham MCCU against Warwickshire in 2011.  In his only first-class appearance that season, Smith scored 3 runs in the university's first-innings, before being dismissed by Darren Maddy, while in their second-innings he was dismissed by Tom Milnes, having only managed a single run.

References

External links
Joshua Smith at ESPNcricinfo
Joshua Smith at CricketArchive

1992 births
Living people
Cricketers from Oxford
Alumni of Durham University
English cricketers
Durham MCCU cricketers
Oxfordshire cricketers
Wicket-keepers